Košice-Sever (English: Košice-North) is a borough (city ward) of Košice, Slovakia. It is one of the more populous boroughs of the city, as well as the largest of all 22 boroughs, which contributes to its low overall population density. Along with the neighbouring borough of Kavečany, Košice-Sever is the most popular recreational area in the city, frequented particularly by locals, but also visitors.

Statistics
 Area: 
 Population: 20,281 (December 2017)
 Density of population: 370/km² (December 2017)
 District: Košice I
 Mayor: František Ténar (as of 2018 elections)

Tourist attractions 
 Hradová hill
 Košice Castle 
 Hradová observation tower
 Bankov recreational area
 Jahodná recreational area
 Anička pond and recreational area
 Narrow-gauge heritage railway Čermeľská železnica  (also Detská železnica, "Children's Railroad") 
 Alpinka golf course
 Hiking trails
 Cycling trails

Gallery

References

External links

 Official website of the Košice-Sever borough
 Article on the Košice-Sever borough at Cassovia.sk
 Official website of Košice

Boroughs of Košice